The Pannonian Basin, or Carpathian Basin, is a large basin situated in south-east Central Europe. The geomorphological term Pannonian Plain is more widely used for roughly the same region though with a somewhat different sense, with only the lowlands, the plain that remained when the Pliocene Epoch Pannonian Sea dried out.

It is a geomorphological subsystem of the Alps-Himalaya system, specifically a sediment-filled back-arc basin which spread apart during the Miocene. The plain or basin is diagonally bisected by the Transdanubian Mountains, separating the larger Great Hungarian Plain (including the Eastern Slovak Lowland) from the Little Hungarian Plain. It forms a topographically discrete unit set in the European landscape, surrounded by imposing geographic boundaries—the Carpathian Mountains and the Alps. The Rivers Danube and Tisza divide the basin roughly in half. It extends roughly between Vienna in the northwest, Košice in the northeast, Zagreb in the southwest, Novi Sad in the south and Satu Mare in the east.

In terms of modern state boundaries, the Pannonian Basin centres on the territory of Hungary, which lies entirely within the basin, but it also covers parts of southern Slovakia, southeast Poland, southwest Ukraine, western Romania, northern Serbia, northeast Croatia, northeast Slovenia, and eastern Austria. The name "Pannonian" comes from Pannonia, a province of the Roman Empire. Only the western part of the territory (known as Transdanubia) of modern Hungary formed part of the ancient Pannonia; this comprises less than 29% of modern Hungary, therefore Hungarian geographers avoid the terms "Pannonian Basin" and "Pannonian Plain" (For example: The Great Hungarian Plain was not part of Pannonia province.) Because the "Pannonian" term is erroneous and unhistorical regarding to the 80% of the whole territory of the basin, the Hungarian geographers and historians use the more accurate Carpathian Basin term.

Terminology
In English language, the terms "Pannonian Basin" and "Carpathian Basin" are used synonymously. The name "Pannonian" is taken from that of Pannonia, a province of the Roman Empire. The historical province overlapped but was not coterminous with the geographical plain or basin, as the Great Hungarian Plain was not part of it. Pannonia Inferior covered much of the western half of the basin, as far as the Danube. Pannonia Superior included the western fringe of the basin as well as part of the Eastern Alps, as far as Virunum. The southern fringe of the basin was in Dalmatia and Moesia. The eastern half of the basin was not conquered by the Romans and was considered part of Sarmatia, inhabited by the Iazyges. Likewise, the parts north of the Danube (now in western Slovakia) were not in the empire; they were considered part of Germania, inhabited by the Quadi.

The term Pannonian Plain refers to the lowland parts of the Pannonian Basin as well as those of some adjoining regions like Lower Austria, Moravia, and Silesia (Czech Republic and Poland). The lands adjoining the plain proper are sometimes also called peri-Pannonian.

The term Carpathian Basin is used in Hungarian literature, while the West Slavic languages (Czech, Polish and Slovak), the Serbo-Croatian, German and Romanian languages use Pannonian; in Hungarian the basin is known as Kárpát-medence, in Czech; Panonská pánev, in Polish; Panoński Basen, in Slovak; Panónska panva, in Slovenian and Serbo-Croatian: Panonski bazen/Панонски базен, in German; Pannonisches Becken, and in Romanian; Câmpia Panonică or Bazinul Panonic. The East Slavic languages, namely Ukrainian, use terms Tisa-Danube Basin or Middanubian Basin

In Hungarian geographical literature various subdivisions of the Carpathian Mountains (Inner Western Carpathians, Inner Eastern Carpathians, Southern Carpathians, Western Carpathians and Transylvanian Plateau) are also considered parts of the Carpathian Basin on the basis of traditional geopolitical divisions.

Etymology

Julius Pokorny derived the name Pannonia from Illyrian, from the Proto-Indo-European root *pen-, "swamp, water, wet" (cf. English fen, "marsh"; Hindi pani, "water").

The name "Carpates" is highly associated with the old Dacian tribes called "Carpes" or "Carpi" who lived in a large area from the east, northeast of the Black Sea to the Transylvanian Plain on the present day Romania and Moldova. The name Carpates may ultimately be from the Proto Indo-European root *sker-/*ker-, which meant mountain, rock, or rugged (cf. Germanic root *skerp-, Old Norse  "harrow", Gothic skarpo, Middle Low German scharf "potsherd", and Modern High German Scherbe "shard", Old English  and English sharp, Lithuanian kar~pas "cut, hack, notch", Latvian cìrpt "to shear, clip"). The archaic Polish word karpa meant 'rugged irregularities, underwater obstacles/rocks, rugged roots, or trunks'. The more common word skarpa means a sharp cliff or other vertical terrain. The name may instead come from Indo-European * 'to turn', akin to Old English  'to turn, change' (English warp) and Greek   'wrist', perhaps referring to the way the mountain range bends or veers in an L-shape.

Geography

Climate and natural resources
Although rain is not plentiful, the plain is a major agricultural area; it is sometimes said that these fields of rich loamy loess soil could feed the whole of Europe. However, there is an increase in extreme precipitation events that cause soil erosion. Knowledge of areas affected by severe soil erosion can lead to the implementation of effective measures to reduce it. For its early settlers, the plain offered few sources of metals or stone. Thus when archaeologists come upon objects of obsidian or chert, copper or gold, they have almost unparalleled opportunities to interpret ancient pathways of trade.

Geomorphology

The Pannonian plain is divided into two parts along the Transdanubian Mountains (Hungarian: Dunántúli-középhegység). The northwestern part is called Western Pannonian plain (or province) and the southeastern part Eastern Pannonian plain (or province). They comprise the following sections:

Western Pannonian Plain (province):
Vienna Basin
Little Hungarian Plain
Eastern Pannonian Plain (province):
Great Hungarian Plain
Pannonian Island Mountains
Transdanubian Mountains (Hungarian: Dunántúli-középhegység)
Drava–Mura lowlands

Note: The Transylvanian Plateau and the Lučenec-Košice Depression (both parts of the Carpathians) and some other lowlands are sometimes also considered part of the Pannonian Plain in non-geomorphological or older divisions.

Regions
Relatively large or distinctive areas of the plain that do not necessarily correspond to national borders include:

Bačka/Bácska (Serbia, Hungary)
Šajkaška (Serbia)
Telečka (Serbia)
Gornji Breg (Serbia)
Banat (Romania, Serbia, Hungary)
Pančevački Rit (Serbia)
Veliki Rit (Serbia)
Gornje Livade (Serbia)
Baranya/Baranja (Hungary, Croatia)
Burgenland (Neusiedler Basin), Austria
Crişana (Hungary, Romania)
Great Hungarian Plain (Hungary, Croatia, Serbia, Slovakia, Romania, Ukraine)
Jászság (Hungary)
Kunság (Hungary)
Little Hungarian Plain (Kisalföld/Malá dunajská kotlina – Hungary, Slovakia)
Mačva (Serbia)
Međimurje (Croatia)
Moravia (part), Czech Republic
Moslavina (Croatia)
Podravina (Croatia, Hungary, around Drava river)
Podunavlje (Serbia, Croatia, around Danube river)
Pokuplje (Croatia, around Kupa river)
Pomoravlje (part), Serbia, around Morava river
Pomorišje (Romania, Hungary, Serbia, around Mureș river)
Posavina (Croatia, Bosnia and Herzegovina, Serbia, around Sava river)
Potisje (Serbia, around Tisa river)
Prekmurje (Slovenia)
Semberija (Bosnia and Herzegovina)
Slavonia (Croatia)
Palača (Croatia)
Srem/Srijem (Serbia, Croatia)
Podlužje (Serbia)
Šokadija (Croatia)
Spačva (Croatia, Serbia)
Cvelferija (Croatia)
Zakarpattia Lowland (Ukraine)
Transdanubia (Hungary)
Vienna Basin (part), Austria
Vojvodina (Serbia)
several more inside Hungary, see: Counties of Hungary, Regions of Hungary
several more inside Slovakia, see: Traditional regions of Slovakia, Regions of Slovakia

History

Prehistory

The Pannonian Basin has its geological origins in the Pannonian Sea, a shallow sea that reached its greatest extent during the Pliocene Epoch, when three to four kilometres of sediments were deposited.

Antiquity

The plain was named after the Pannon named Medes. Various different peoples inhabited the plain during its history. In the first century BC, the eastern parts of the plain belonged to the Dacian state, and in the first century AD its western parts were subsumed into the Roman Empire. The Roman province named Pannonia was established in the area, and the city of Sirmium, today Sremska Mitrovica, Serbia, became one of the four capital cities of the Roman Empire in the 3rd century.

Middle Ages

In the Age of Migrations and the early Middle Ages, the region belonged to several realms such as the Hun Empire, the Kingdom of the Gepids, the Kingdom of the Ostrogoths, the Kingdom of the Lombards, the Avar Khaganate, the West Slavic state of Samo, the Bulgarian Empire, the Frankish Empire, Great Moravia, the Lower Pannonian Principality and the Kingdom of Syrmia. The Principality of Hungary established in 895 by the Magyars was centered on the plain and included almost all of it (as did the former Avar Khaganate). It was established as the Catholic Kingdom of Hungary in AD 1000, with the coronation of Stephen I of Hungary.
The Kingdom of Hungary by the 11th century comprised the entire Pannonian Basin, but the changing fates of this part of Europe during the Ottoman wars of the 14th to 17th centuries left the Pannonian basin divided between numerous political entities. After the Battle of Mohács in 1526, the central and eastern regions of the kingdom and the plain on which they lay were incorporated into the Ottoman Empire, while the remainder to the north-west was subsumed into the holdings of the Habsburg monarchy and retitled Royal Hungary. Under Ottoman administration, the plain was reorganised into the Eyalet of Budim, the Eyalet of Egri, the Eyalet of Sigetvar and the Eyalet of Temeşvar.

Modern history
The Pannonian Plain was frequently a scene of conflict between the two empires. At the end of the 17th century the Habsburgs won decisive battles against the Ottomans, and most of the plain gradually came under Habsburg rule. Under Habsburg rule the region was eventually reorganised into the Kingdom of Hungary, the Banat of Temeswar, the Military Frontier, the Kingdom of Croatia, the Kingdom of Slavonia and Voivodeship of Serbia and Temes Banat.

The Habsburg Monarchy was subsequently transformed into the Austrian Empire (in 1804) and later became Austria-Hungary (in 1867). Most of the plain was located within the Hungarian part of Austria-Hungary, since all other Habsburg possessions in the plain were integrated into the Kingdom of Hungary until 1882. The autonomous Kingdom of Croatia-Slavonia, which was one of the Lands of the Crown of St. Stephen, comprised the south-western portion of the plain.

With the dissolution of Austria-Hungary after World War I, the region was divided between Hungary, Romania, Czechoslovakia, Austria and the Kingdom of Serbs, Croats and Slovenes (renamed to Yugoslavia in 1929). The borders drawn in 1918 and 1919 are mostly preserved as those of the contemporary states of Austria, Czech Republic, Hungary, Poland, Slovakia, Serbia, Ukraine, Croatia, and Romania.

Major cities
This is a list of cities in the Pannonian Basin with a population larger than 100,000 within the city proper:
Budapest  Hungary (1,750,268) 
Belgrade  Serbia (1,166,763) 
Zagreb  Croatia (812,635) 
Bratislava  Slovakia (546,300) 
Timișoara  Romania (319,279 ) 
Novi Sad  Serbia (277,522) 
Košice  Slovakia (240,688) 
Debrecen  Hungary (204,333) 
Oradea  Romania (196,367) 
Miskolc  Hungary (162,905) 
Szeged  Hungary (161,837) 
Arad  Romania (159,704) 
Pécs  Hungary (147,719) 
Győr  Hungary (128,567) 
Nyíregyháza  Hungary (118,185) 
Uzhhorod  Ukraine (115,163) 
Kecskemét  Hungary (111,863) 
Osijek  Croatia (108,048) 
Subotica  Serbia (105,681) 
Satu Mare  Romania (102,441)

See also
Geography of Europe
Central Europe
Pannonian Biogeographic Region
Pannonian Sea
Transdanubian Mountains
Pelso unit
Tisza unit

References

External links

Zentai László's account of the Basin formation In Hungarian.
Anthropological sketch of the prehistoric population
Körös Regional Archaeological Project: Neolithic and Copper Age archaeology in the Pannonian plain

 
Aulacogens
Basins of Europe
Structural basins
Sedimentary basins of Europe
Back-arc basins
Geology of Austria
Geology of Bosnia and Herzegovina
Geology of Croatia
Geology of the Czech Republic
Geology of Europe
Geology of Hungary
Geology of Poland
Geology of Romania
Geology of Serbia
Geology of Slovakia
Structural basins of Slovenia
Geology of Ukraine
Landforms of Lower Austria
Landforms of Bosnia and Herzegovina
Landforms of Croatia
Landforms of the Czech Republic
Landforms of Slovenia
Plains of Europe
Plains of Austria
Plains of Hungary
Plains of Romania
Plains of Serbia
Plains of Slovakia
Plains of Ukraine
Geography of Vojvodina
Banat
Bačka
Syrmia
Pannonia